The Great Northern Railway (Ireland) T2 class was a class of 4-4-2T tank locomotives. The GNR(I) had introduced the T class numbered 185–189 in 1913.  They were designed for both suburban services and longer runs such as Dublin to Drogheda and Belfast to Armagh.  They proved so successful that a further twenty were commissioned in 1921, 1924 and 1929.  Although externally identical in appearance to the T, they were classified as the T2 class having larger tanks and higher boiler pressure, and were used successfully on both fast passenger work and freight.

Model 
The T2 is currently available as a 00 gauge etched-brass kit from Studio Scale Models.  It includes transfers, brass etches, most nameplates and cast white metal parts.

See also
 Diesel Locomotives of Ireland
 Multiple Units of Ireland
 Coaching Stock of Ireland
 Steam locomotives of Ireland

References

T2
4-4-2T locomotives
Beyer, Peacock locomotives
Nasmyth, Wilson and Company locomotives
Railway locomotives introduced in 1921
Steam locomotives of Ireland
Steam locomotives of Northern Ireland
Passenger locomotives
Scrapped locomotives
5 ft 3 in gauge locomotives
2′B1′ h2t locomotives